King Jesus is a semi-historical novel by Robert Graves, first published in 1946. The novel  treats the historical Jesus not as the Son of God, but rather as a philosopher with a legitimate claim to the Judaean throne through Herod the Great, as well as the Davidic monarchy; and treats numerous Biblical stories in a non-religious manner.

Synopsis
Graves wrote the story from the perspective of an official living in the time of Domitian.  The novel opens with the statement, "I, AGABUS the Decapolitan, began this work at Alexandria in the ninth year of the Emperor Domitian and completed it at Rome in the thirteenth year of the same." The novel consists primarily of dialogues between the prophets and other people of the story told by the Roman hagiographer. It begins with the reign of Herod before Jesus is born and explains the dynastical, quasi-secular roots of Jesus both from his mother's and his father's side, establishing a temporal and historical right to the throne of Israel. The second part starts with the Nativity and Jesus's youth. Finally, the third part chronicles Jesus's work in adulthood as a prophet, his death on the cross, and his resurrection.

In a "Historical Commentary" published at the end of the book Robert Graves remarks, concerning the book's historical basis, "A detailed commentary written to justify the unorthodox views contained in this book would be two or three times as long as the book itself, and would take years to complete; I beg to be excused the task ...[but]...I undertake to my readers that every important element in my story is based on some tradition, however tenuous, and that I have taken more than ordinary pains to verify my historical background".

Editions
The standard scholarly edition is the volume in the Collected Works of Robert Graves (Carcanet Press), edited by Robert A. Davis.

Reception
A 1946 review by Kirkus Reviews summarized the book with; "This is not reading for the easily shocked; it definitely presents Jesus as a sage and a poet, if not divine. It moves, as does all Mr. Graves' writing, at a brilliant fast pace, and with a tremendous style." In another contemporary book review by Commentary, Mordecai Chertoff wrote "the Jewish reviewer must protest and warn the reader of Graves’ total irresponsibility in his handling of Jewish religious tradition. It is obvious, however, that Graves’ intention in writing this "novel" was not to compose a historical pot-boiler. Influenced perhaps by depth psychology, he feels, apparently, that the issue between the "rule" of the father and that of the mother animated Jewish religion and political history in a preponderant way, and that the supremacy of the father was there established once and for all. There are certain risks, however, when such a serious thesis is dealt with by a novelist, even if he does not mean to be taken very earnestly. There is the danger that untutored people.. will take this invented lore for the real thing and read his fantasy for the sake of edification and erudition." Writing in 1981 for The New York Times, John Leonard describes the book's relation to Gnosticism and wrote, "Mr. Graves, in other words, is still pushing his White Goddess, the mother of all religions, and when we learn that one of Herod's grandsons was helpful to Claudius at a sticky moment, we understand why Mr. Graves involved himself in his farrago in the first place."

Later references
Herodian Messiah is a work of non-fiction that presents evidence and arguments in support of the central theory of King Jesus (i.e., that Jesus was the son of Antipater ben Herod and Mariamne bat Antigonus).

References

External links
Old Heresy, New Version. Review of King Jesus from Time Magazine, Monday, September 30, 1946

1946 British novels
Novels by Robert Graves
Novelistic portrayals of Jesus
Novels set in ancient Israel
English novels
Novels set in ancient Rome
Cassell (publisher) books